The Revolutionary Guards Party (Arabic: حزب حراس الثورة) is a political party in Egypt that ran in the 2015 Egyptian parliamentary election. Currently, it holds one seat in the Egyptian House of Representatives.

References

Political parties in Egypt